The Worksop Factory is a main food manufacturing site in Bassetlaw District in north Nottinghamshire that makes well-known types of instant food, such as instant noodles, as well as well-known gravy products.

History
In July 1969, £750,000 was invested in a new plant for packet soups, to open in 1971. In 1969, the extension to the factory was began by local MP Joe Ashton; it would employ 300 more people.

Industrial action
In September 1977, a nine-week strike by the TGWU cost the company £5.5m.

Production
In the mid-1980s, £2m was invested at the site. Cardboard for the tubs is provided by Sonoco Europe, in Chesterfield; the former Robinson Paperboard Packaging was bought in July 2011.

Oxo
Oxo was made at Great Harwood from 1939 to December 1992, when production was moved to Worksop by Unilever. Around four hundred employees had been at  the Great Harwood site in Lancashire, but Unilever had tried to build a new factory in the 1980s, which was blocked by the local council. Oxo became part of Van den Bergh Foods in 1995 at Crawley.

Gravy and salt
Saxa salt and Bisto were made at Middlewich in Cheshire until September 2008, which was the former Cerebos until 1968.

Food sauces
In 1995 Ragú sauce and Chicken Tonight started to be made at the site, the first in the UK; there were many TV advertisements. The process line was built by T Musk Engineering of Swadlincote, part of WT Parker.

Visits
The site was featured on BBC Two on Tuesday 14 August 2018.

See also
 Food Manufacturers Federation
 List of instant noodle brands

References

External links
 The site in June 1952

Buildings and structures completed in 1982
Buildings and structures in Nottinghamshire
Dried foods
Economy of Nottinghamshire
Food manufacturers of England
Manufacturing plants in England
Rice production
Worksop